Kohleria is a New World genus of the flowering plant family Gesneriaceae. The plants are generally tropical herbs or subshrubs with velvety stems and foliage and brightly colored flowers with spots or markings in contrasting colors. They are rhizomatous and commonly include a period of dormancy in their growth cycle. The genus was revised in 1992 and was then recognized as having 19 species distributed in Central America and South America. phylogenetic in 2005 indicated that the epiphytic genus Capanea is derived from within Kohleria, and the two species of Capanea were subsequently transferred to Kohleria. The genus Pearcea is closely related.

Because of their colorful and exotically patterned flowers, as well as a general interest in the many tropical flowering plants that were being introduced from the Americas, kohlerias were very popular in England and Europe in the 19th century. Many species and hybrids were lavishly illustrated in horticultural magazines such as Curtis's Botanical Magazine under the discarded or erroneous names of Achimenes, Gesneria, Isoloma, Sciadocalyx, and Tydaea.  These species and hybrids almost entirely disappeared in the early 20th century, and plant breeders have only recently begun to work extensively with this genus again.

Several species are widespread, variable, weedy, and tend to hybridize in the wild, and numerous names have been described that are synonyms of other species or are hybrid taxa.

Selected species and varieties 
, Plants of the World Online accepted the following species:

Kohleria affinis (Fritsch) Roalson & Boggan (syn. Capanea affinis)
Kohleria allenii Standl. & L.O.Williams
Kohleria amabilis (Planch. & Linden) Fritsch
Kohleria anisophylla (Fritsch) Wiehler
Kohleria bella C.V.Morton
Kohleria diastemoides L.P.Kvist & L.E.Skog
Kohleria × gigantea (Planch.) Fritsch
Kohleria grandiflora L.P.Kvist & L.E.Skog
Kohleria hirsuta (Kunth) Regel
Kohleria hondensis (Kunth) Regel
Kohleria hypertrichosa J.L.Clark & L.E.Skog
Kohleria inaequalis (Benth.) Wiehler
Kohleria longicalyx L.P.Kvist & L.E.Skog
Kohleria neglecta L.P.Kvist & L.E.Skog
Kohleria peruviana Fritsch
Kohleria rugata (Scheidw.) L.P.Kvist & L.E.Skog
Kohleria spicata (Kunth) Oerst.
Kohleria stuebeliana Fritsch
Kohleria tigridia (Ohlend.) Roalson & Boggan (syn. Capanea grandiflora)
Kohleria trianae (Regel) Hanst.
Kohleria tubiflora (Cav.) Hanst.
Kohleria villosa (Fritsch) Wiehler
Kohleria warszewiczii (Regel) Hanst. – AGM

Cultivation
Their showy flowers and ease of culture have made them popular with growers of indoor houseplants. Numerous species and hybrids are now in cultivation, some with patterned or variegated foliage as well as vivid flowers. They are easily propagated by both stem cuttings and division of the rhizomes.

References and external links

Kvist, L.P. & L.E. Skog.  1992. Revision of Kohleria (Gesneriaceae). Smithsonian Contributions to Botany 79: 1-83, pdf.

Kohleria from The Genera of Gesneriaceae
Kohleria and Koellikeria from the Gesneriad Reference Web
Kohleria  from the eGradini.ro - Romanian Gardening Website

Gesnerioideae
Gesneriaceae genera
Taxa named by Eduard August von Regel